The Wuluwati Dam is a concrete-face rock-fill dam on the Kalakashi River in Hotan County, Xinjiang, China. The dam serves to provide water supply, hydroelectric power generation and recreation. Construction began in 1993 with the river's diversion and in 1995, construction on the dam began. The first two generators were operational in December 2000 and the last two in January 2001. The dam's power station contains four 15 MW Francis turbine-generators.

See also

List of dams and reservoirs in China
List of major power stations in Xinjiang

References

Dams in China
Hydroelectric power stations in Xinjiang
Concrete-face rock-fill dams
Dams completed in 2001